Lord John in New York is a 1915 American silent mystery film directed by Edward J. Le Saint based on a story by C.N. and A.M. Williamson. Starring William Garwood in the lead role, it was the first film in the five film series of Lord John's Journal. The film is now considered lost.

Cast
William Garwood as Lord John
Stella Razeto as Maida Odell
Ogden Crane as Roger Odell
Walter Belasco as Paola Tostini
Jay Belasco as Antonio Tostini
T. D. Crittenden as Carr Price
Doc Crane as L.J. Calit
Grace Benham as Grace Callender
Laura Oakley as Head Sister
Albert MacQuarrie as Doctor Ramese
Gretchen Lederer

See also
The Grey Sisterhood (1916)
Three Fingered Jenny (1916)
The Eye of Horus (1916)
The League of the Future (1916)

References

External links

1915 films
American mystery drama films
American silent feature films
American black-and-white films
Films directed by Edward LeSaint
Universal Pictures films
Lost American films
1915 drama films
Films based on short fiction
1910s mystery drama films
Films based on works by Alice Williamson
1910s American films
Silent American drama films
Silent mystery drama films
1910s English-language films